Habarana massacre may refer to:

 Aluth Oya massacre (1987), Sri Lanka
 2006 Digampathana bombing, Sri Lanka